"The Air That I Breathe" is a ballad written by British-Gibraltarian singer-songwriter Albert Hammond and Mike Hazlewood, initially recorded by Hammond on his debut album, It Never Rains in Southern California (1972). It was a major hit for the Hollies in early 1974, reaching number two in the UK Singles Chart.

History
"The Air That I Breathe" was a major hit for the Hollies in early 1974, reaching number two in the UK Singles Chart. In mid-1974, it reached number six in the United States on the Billboard Hot 100 chart and number three on the Adult Contemporary chart. In Canada, the song peaked at number five on the RPM magazine charts. The audio engineering for "The Air That I Breathe" was done by Alan Parsons. In an interview, Parsons mentioned that Eric Clapton said the first note of "The Air That I Breathe" had more soul than anything he had ever heard.

This version of the song featured a string orchestra arrangement, which also featured a horn section.

Record World said that "the potent material gets a super interpretation."

The 1992 Radiohead song "Creep" uses a similar chord progression and shares some melodic content with the 1972 version of "The Air That I Breathe". As a result, the song's publisher sued Radiohead for copyright infringement and a settlement was reached in which Hammond and Hazlewood were given co-writing credits and a portion of the royalties.

Charts

Weekly charts

Year-end charts

Simply Red version

British soul and pop band Simply Red released a cover of "The Air That I Breathe" on their sixth album, Blue (1998). It peaked at number five in Scotland, number six in the UK and number 17 in Austria. On the Eurochart Hot 100, it reached number 35. A music video was also produced to promote the single.

Critical reception
Gene Armstrong from Arizona Daily Star declared the Simply Red version as "a sexy version". J.D. Considine from The Baltimore Sun felt "his Marvin Gaye-like" take on the track "is wonderfully audacious". Larry Flick from Billboard viewed it as  "an inspired, groove-laden interpretation", remarking that "Hucknall brings his signature soul to the track, vamping with glee while the band pumps a mild, jeep-styled beat that is hard enough for R&B listeners but soft enough to tickle the fancy of AC and triple-A radio listeners." He added, "Popsters will soon be treated to a bevy of remixes by Sean "Puffy" Combs and Stevie J., which should make top 40 punters quickly sit up and take notice." A reviewer from Daily Record commented, "You'll be looking for a breath of fresh air after hearing Mick Hucknall's middle-of-the-road reworking of this song which was originally a hit for The Hollies. The band desperately need a dose of originality."

Track listings
 CD single, Europe (1998)
 "The Air That I Breathe" – 4:24
 "The Air That I Breathe" (Reprise) – 4:35
 "So Many People" (Live) – 5:44
 "Never Never Love" (Live) – 4:34

 CD single CD1, UK (1998)
 "The Air That I Breathe" – 4:24
 "Tu Sei Dentro Di Me (Someday In My Life)" – 4:02
 "Lives And Loves" (Live) – 3:32

 CD single CD2, Europe and UK (1998)
 "The Air That I Breathe" (Reprise) – 4:35
 "The Air That I Breathe" – 4:24
 "Love Has Said Goodbye Again" (Rae & Christian Mix) – 5:14

Charts

Release history

Other cover versions

Olivia Newton-John on her 1975 album Have You Never Been Mellow and later on her Deluxe Edition 2022 issued Olivia Newton-John's Greatest Hits.
Rex Allen Jr. in 1983; this version was released for the country music market. Allen's version peaked at number 37 on the Billboard Hot Country Singles chart in December 1983.
Julio Iglesias in 1984 on his hit album 1100 Bel Air Place which established him as a star in the English-speaking entertainment industry.
Alien on their self-titled 1989 album.
k.d. lang on her 1997 album Drag, which featured cover songs with a smoking motif.
Semisonic on their Singing in my Sleep single in 1998.
The Mavericks on their self-titled 2003 album. Their version peaked at number 59 on the Billboard Hot Country Songs chart.

References

1974 singles
Songs written by Albert Hammond
Songs written by Mike Hazlewood
Albert Hammond songs
The Hollies songs
Rex Allen Jr. songs
1998 singles
Simply Red songs
The Mavericks songs
Number-one singles in South Africa
Number-one singles in New Zealand
1970s ballads
1972 songs
Polydor Records singles
Epic Records singles
East West Records singles